Harry F. Garrett (December 24, 1887 – August 10, 1971) was a justice of the Iowa Supreme Court from December 15, 1958, to December 31, 1960, appointed from Wayne County, Iowa.

References

External links

Justices of the Iowa Supreme Court
1887 births
1971 deaths
20th-century American judges